Pierpaolo Pedroni (20 May 1964, in Cremona – 23 June 2009, in Milan) was an Italian rugby union player, rugby union referee and sports commentator. He played as a lock and as a number eight.

Pedroni played most of his career at Amatori Rugby Milano, where he premiered in the first category at 1982/83 and would play until 1996/97. He spent a brief stint at SU Agen in the Autumn of 1997, returning soon to Amatori Rugby Milano, where he would stay until 1999/2000. During his time at Milano he won 4 Italian Championship titles, in 1990/91, 1991/92, 1994/95 and 1995/96, and the Cup of Italy, in 1994/95. He spent his final season at Crociati Parma Rugby FC in 1999/2000, finishing his career at 36 years old.

Pedroni had 25 caps for Italy, from 1989 to 1996, scoring 2 tries, 10 points on aggregate. He was called for the 1995 Rugby World Cup, playing in three games but without scoring.

He decided to take the referee course after finishing his player career and became habilitated as a referee in 2004, for the Series B. He was also a sports commentator for Eurosport and Italian television.

He died unexpectedly at 23 June 2009 from a heart attack, aged 45 years old.

References

External links

1964 births
2009 deaths
Italian rugby union players
Italy international rugby union players
Italian rugby union referees
Rugby union locks
Rugby union number eights
Sportspeople from Cremona
Amatori Rugby Milano players